Veryovkin 2-y is a rural locality (a settlement) in Nizhnekamenskoye Rural Settlement, Talovsky District, Voronezh Oblast, Russia. The population was 168 as of 2010.

Geography 
Veryovkin 2-y is located 8 km northeast of Talovaya (the district's administrative centre) by road. Nizhnyaya Kamenka is the nearest rural locality.

References 

Rural localities in Talovsky District